Rittersberg may refer to:

Rittersberg, Marienberg, a district of Marienberg, Germany
Ritoznoj (German name Rittersberg), a settlement in northeastern Slovenia
a fictive town from the point-and-click adventure game The Beast Within: A Gabriel Knight Mystery